Dave Strasser (born July 13, 1969) is a retired American mixed martial arts fighter who competed in the Welterweight division for the UFC, Shooto, M-1 Global, and Cage Rage. 14 of his 25 career wins came by way of submission.

Background
Strasser competed in high school wrestling and collegiate wrestling, in addition to boxing and Shidokan Karate. His studying of Shidokan led a six-month stay in Japan to compete in kickboxing.

Mixed martial arts career
Strasser's second professional fight was a no-rules bout against a fighter making his professional debut, Travis Fulton. Strasser subdued the inexperienced Fulton with a choke hold from behind. Fulton would go on to become one of the most prolific fighters in mixed martial arts history, with over 300 recorded professional fights as of November 2011.

Strasser trained with Pat Miletich and Jeremy Horn from 1996-97.

UFC
At UFC 42, Strasser fought against Romie Aram. Aram had been undefeated before the fight, and was being groomed by the UFC for a possible title shot against Matt Hughes. As such, Aram came into the fight as the favorite. In the first round, Strasser was immediately dropped by a punch to the head, but he successfully pulled guard, and the referee stood the fighters up. Strasser scored a takedown later in the round, delivering punches and elbows from the top position. Strasser controlled the second round with standup striking, though Aram remained competitive. The fighters remained on their feet in the third round, with Aram delivering more powerful punches but Strasser displaying better precision. Strasser's blows in this round made Aram's nose bleed. All three judges scored the fight for Strasser, and he won by unanimous decision.

Strasser fought again in the UFC at UFC 44. In the welterweight match, his opponent was judo practitioner Karo Parisyan, who was making his debut in the UFC. Parisyan's status as a student of notable judokas Gene LeBell and Gokor Chivchyan increased fan interest in the bout, but the 21-year-old was still seen as a significant underdog. When the fight started, Strasser attempted to stay on his feet and exchange punches. Parisyan, however, performed a judo throw, which put Strasser on the ground and placed him in position for a kimura armlock, which Parisyan duly applied. As a result of the hold, Strasser submitted at 3:52 of the first round. This fight was notable, as judokas had not enjoyed many prior successes in MMA competitions, and Parisyan's win helped to establish judo as a viable martial arts style in MMA.

Other ventures
Strasser has also worked as a mixed martial arts trainer and promoter. He runs a gym, Dave Strasser's Freestyle Academy, in Kenosha, Wisconsin. Nick Thompson, Jameel Massouh, and Ben Rothwell are among the fighters who have trained with Strasser.

Personal life
Strasser comes from a very athletic family and has three brothers and two sisters. His father was an all-state sprinter and football player who was recruited by Miami University and other NCAA Division I schools. Strasser's uncle was a talented weightlifter, holding the state record for the squat and dead-lift. Strasser's siblings' accomplishments have ranged from a state finals champion in Cross Country, player of the year in baseball, all-state in basketball, NCAA Division I runner, among many other notable feats. One of his brothers, Mark, played professional football in Sweden and set Division I records for Central Connecticut State University. Mark went on to work for the Minnesota Twins organization. He is currently a teacher and Head Football Coach of Stuyvesant High School in New York City. Strasser now has a wife and one daughter.

Mixed martial arts record

|-
| Win
| align=center| 25–8–4
| Steve Corley
| Submission (injury)
| FCC 34 – Freestyle Combat Challenge 34
| 
| align=center| 1
| 
| Wisconsin, United States
| 
|-
| Loss
| align=center| 24–8–4
| Paul Daley
| Decision (unanimous)
| Cage Rage 16
| 
| align=center| 3
| align=center| 5:00
| London, England
| 
|-
| Win
| align=center| 24–7–4
| Emyr Bussade
| Decision
| MFC – Boardwalk Blitz
| 
| align=center| 3
| align=center| 5:00
| New Jersey, United States
| 
|-
| Win
| align=center| 23–7–4
| Derrick Reed
| Submission
| LOF 2 – Legends of Fighting 2
| 
| align=center| 1
| 
| Indiana, United States
| 
|-
| Loss
| align=center| 22–7–4
| Hidetaka Monma
| KO (punch)
| GCM – D.O.G. 2
| 
| align=center| 1
| align=center| 3:30
| Tokyo, Japan
| 
|-
| Win
| align=center| 22–6–4
| Brian Dunn
| TKO
| FCC 19 – Freestyle Combat Challenge 19
| 
| align=center| N/A
| 
| Wisconsin, United States
| 
|-
| Loss
| align=center| 21–6–4
| Georges St-Pierre
| Submission (kimura)
| TKO 19 – Rage
| 
| align=center| 1
| align=center| 1:52
| Quebec, Canada
| 
|-
| Win
| align=center| 21–5–4
| Pat Healy
| Decision (unanimous)
| MT 1 – Madtown Throwdown 1
| 
| align=center| N/A
| 
| Wisconsin, United States
| 
|-
| Loss
| align=center| 20–5–4
| Ansar Chalangov
| Submission (guillotine choke)
| M-1 MFC - Russia vs. The World 7
| 
| align=center| 1
| align=center| 0:53
| St. Petersburg, Russia
| 
|-
| Loss
| align=center| 20–4–4
| Karo Parisyan
| Submission (kimura)
| UFC 44
| 
| align=center| 1
| align=center| 3:52
| Nevada, United States
| 
|-
| Win
| align=center| 20–3–4
| Romie Aram
| Decision (unanimous)
| UFC 42
| 
| align=center| 3
| align=center| 5:00
| Florida, United States
| 
|-
| Draw
| align=center| 19–3–4
| Islam Karimov
| Draw
| M-1 MFC - Russia vs. the World 4
| 
| align=center| 2
| align=center| 5:00
| St. Petersburg, Russia
| 
|-
| Win
| align=center| 19–3–3
| Seichi Ikemoto
| Submission (rear naked choke)
| Shooto - Treasure Hunt 7
| 
| align=center| 1
| align=center| 3:10
| Osaka, Japan
| 
|-
| Win
| align=center| 18–3–3
| Takuya Wada
| Decision (split)
| Shooto - Treasure Hunt 6
| 
| align=center| 3
| align=center| 5:00
| Tokyo, Japan
| 
|-
| Win
| align=center| 17–3–3
| Alexandre Barros
| Decision
| HOOKnSHOOT – Overdrive
| 
| align=center| 3
| align=center| 5:00
| Indiana, United States
| 
|-
| Loss
| align=center| 16–3–3
| Ronald Jhun
| Submission (armbar)
| SB 21 – SuperBrawl 21
| 
| align=center| 2
| align=center| 4:42
| Hawaii, United States
| 
|-
| Draw
| align=center| 16–2–3
| Chris Lytle
| Draw
| RSF 3 – Reality Submission Fighting 3
| 
| align=center| 1
| align=center| 18:00
| Illinois, United States
| 
|-
| Win
| align=center| 16–2–2
| Steve Miller
| TKO (cut)
| IC 1 – Iowa Challenge 1
| 
| align=center| 1
| 
| Iowa, United States
| 
|-
| Win
| align=center| 15–2–2
| Riley McIlhon
| Submission (strikes)
| FCC 3 – Freestyle Combat Challenge 3
| 
| align=center| 1
| align=center| 3:23
| 
| 
|-
| Win
| align=center| 14–2–2
| Paul Rodriguez
| Decision (majority)
| WEF 8 – Goin' Platinum
| 
| align=center| 3
| align=center| 4:00
| Georgia, United States
| 
|-
| Win
| align=center| 13–2–2
| Eric Meaders
| TKO
| NG 13 – Neutral Grounds 13
| 
| align=center| 2
| 
| California, United States
| 
|-
| Win
| align=center| 12–2–2
| Toby Imada
| Submission (armbar)
| NG 13 – Neutral Grounds 13
| 
| align=center| 1
| 
| California, United States
| 
|-
| Loss
| align=center| 11–2–2
| Tom Schmitz
| Submission (triangle choke)
| EC 29 – Extreme Challenge 29
| 
| align=center| 1
| align=center| 1:56
| Wisconsin, United States
| 
|-
| Win
| align=center| 11–1–2
| Sean Brockmole
| TKO (guillotine choke)
| EC 23 – Extreme Challenge 23
| 
| align=center| 1
| align=center| 1:32
| Indiana, United States
| 
|-
| Win
| align=center| 10–1–2
| Jeff Lindsay
| Submission (punches)
| EC 23 – Extreme Challenge 23
| 
| align=center| 1
| align=center| 3:01
| Indiana, United States
| 
|-
| Win
| align=center| 9–1–2
| Brian Campbell
| Submission (keylock)
| Gladiators 2 – Gladiators 2
| 
| align=center| 1
| align=center| 12:20
| Iowa, United States
| 
|-
| Loss
| align=center| 8–1–2
| Adrian Serrano
| Decision (split)
| EC 13 – Extreme Challenge 13
| 
| align=center| 1
| align=center| 20:00
| Wisconsin, United States
| 
|-
| Win
| align=center| 8–0–2
| Brett Al-azzawi
| Submission (punches)
| EC 12 – Extreme Challenge 12
| 
| align=center| 1
| align=center| 3:55
| Michigan, United States
| 
|-
| Win
| align=center| 7–0–2
| Daniel Vianna
| Submission (punches)
| EC 12 – Extreme Challenge 12
| 
| align=center| 1
| align=center| 8:59
| Michigan, United States
| 
|-
| Win
| align=center| 6–0–2
| Phil Johns
| Submission (punches)
| EC 11 – Extreme Challenge 11
| 
| align=center| 1
| align=center| 8:39
| Iowa, United States
| 
|-
| Draw
| align=center| 5–0–2
| Adrian Serrano
| Draw
| EC 10 – Extreme Challenge 10
| 
| align=center| 1
| align=center| 15:00
| Iowa, United States
| 
|-
| Win
| align=center| 5–0–1
| Jesse Jones
| Submission (keylock)
| EC 5 – Extreme Challenge 5
| 
| align=center| 1
| align=center| 9:25
| Iowa, United States
| 
|-
| Win
| align=center| 4–0–1
| Caz Daniels
| Submission (armbar)
| EC 5 – Extreme Challenge 5
| 
| align=center| 1
| align=center| N/A
| Iowa, United States
| 
|-
| Win
| align=center| 3–0–1
| Rolando Higueros
| TKO (cut)
| EC 1 – Extreme Challenge 1
| 
| align=center| 1
| align=center| 8:32
| Iowa, United States
| 
|-
| Draw
| align=center| 2–0–1
| George Schirmer
| Draw
| BATB 1 – Brawl at the Ballpark 1
| 
| align=center| 1
| align=center| 15:00
| Iowa, United States
| 
|-
| Win
| align=center| 2–0
| Travis Fulton
| Submission (rear naked choke)
| Gladiators – Gladiators 1
| 
| align=center| 1
| 
| Iowa, United States
| 
|-
| Win
| align=center| 1–0
| CG Sierra
| Submission (rear naked choke)
| QCU 2 – Quad City Ultimate 2
| 
| align=center| 1
| align=center| 1:40
| Illinois, United States
|

References

External links

 

1969 births
Living people
American male mixed martial artists
Sportspeople from Kenosha, Wisconsin
Mixed martial arts trainers
Mixed martial artists utilizing Shidōkan
Mixed martial artists utilizing boxing
Mixed martial artists utilizing collegiate wrestling
Ultimate Fighting Championship male fighters
American male karateka
American male sport wrestlers
Amateur wrestlers